Gregory Laurence Moriarty (born 4 April 1964) is a senior Australian public servant and diplomat, and the current Secretary of the Department of Defence since 4 September 2017. He was previously the Chief of Staff to Prime Minister Malcolm Turnbull. Moriarty has been Australian Ambassador to Iran from 2005 to 2008, Australian Ambassador to Indonesia from 2010 to 2014, the inaugural Commonwealth Counter-Terrorism Coordinator from 2015 to 2016, and the International and National Security Adviser to the Prime Minister.

Early life and education
Gregory Laurence Moriarty was born in Brisbane, Queensland, on 4 April 1964. He has a Bachelor of Arts with Honours from the University of Western Australia and a Master of Arts in Strategic and Defence Studies from the Strategic and Defence Studies Centre at the Australian National University.

Career

Defence
Moriarty joined the Department of Defence in 1986 and worked in Defence until 1995, primarily in the Defence Intelligence Organisation as a regional analyst. An officer in the Australian Army Reserve, Moriarty was attached to the Headquarters of the United States Central Command in the Persian Gulf during Operations Desert Shield and Operation Desert Storm. Moriarty returned to the Department of Defence in 2017 as the Secretary of the Department of Defence.

Foreign Affairs
Prior to taking up his first ambassadorial role as Australian Ambassador to Iran in March 2005, Moriarty worked in various positions in the Department of Foreign Affairs and Trade, including in the Papua New Guinea Section and with postings at the Australian High Commission in Port Moresby, as Assistant Secretary of the Maritime South East Asia Branch, and Deputy Leader and Senior Negotiator of the Peace Monitoring Group on Bougainville in 1998.

As Ambassador to Iran, he resided in Tehran from 2005 to 2008. While in the role, Moriarty travelled to Washington to brief then US President George Bush on Iranian politics, becoming one of a small number of Australian diplomats ever to have briefed an American president.

Moriarty was the Assistant Secretary for the Parliamentary and Media Branch between 2008 and 2009 and then the First Assistant Secretary for the Consular, Public Diplomacy and Parliamentary Affairs Division from 2009 to 2010 of the Department of Foreign Affairs and Trade.

His nomination by the Australian Government as Australian Ambassador to Indonesia was announced in July 2010. He arrived in Indonesia in late October, immediately prior to the Mount Merapi eruptions and the 2010 Mentawai earthquake and tsunami.

Whilst Moriaty was Ambassador to Indonesia, the Australian Government escalated its border protection policy. The Indonesian Government opposed Australia's boat turnback policy. During the appointment, Moriarty recommended that Australians take the time to learn more about Indonesia to set the two nations up for a great strategic partnership that would help Australian businesses to prosper.

From 2014 to 2015, Moriarty was a Deputy Secretary of the Department of Foreign Affairs and Trade.

Counterterrorism Coordinator
In May 2015, the Australian Government announced Moriarty's appointment as the inaugural Commonwealth Counter-Terrorism Coordination within the Department of the Prime Minister and Cabinet. In the role, Moriarty did not have authority to direct the operations of any particular agency, instead being granted authority "across agencies" to enhance cooperation between Australian intelligence and security agencies. His role was intended to focus primarily on preventing domestic terror threats. Soon after he began in the role, Moriarty told media that he was "stunned" by the depth and extent of the problem. After the terrorist attack in Nice, Moriarty was authorised to examine the full range of people of interest who security agencies are investigating for counter-terrorism purposes, to identify vulnerable persons with mental health concerns or patterns of criminal behavior, and examine measures needed to prevent the radicalisation of such people.

Prime Minister's Office
In September 2016, Prime Minister Malcolm Turnbull appointed Moriarty his International and National Security Adviser. He was then appointed the Prime Minister's Chief of Staff in April 2017 heading up the Prime Minister's Office.

References

1964 births
Ambassadors of Australia to Indonesia
Ambassadors of Australia to Iran
Australian Army officers
Australian National University alumni
Chiefs of Staff to the Prime Minister of Australia
Living people
People from Brisbane
University of Western Australia alumni